"Wasted Times" is a song recorded by Canadian singer the Weeknd, taken from his first EP, My Dear Melancholy, released on March 30, 2018. The song was written by the Weeknd, Brittany Hazzard, Sonny Moore and Adam Feeney, and was produced by Frank Dukes and Skrillex. It was later included on the Weeknd's first greatest hits album The Weeknd in Japan, despite not being released as a single.

Critical reception
The song was met with positive reviews, with various critics naming it one of the best of the Weeknd's discography. It was also included in various best song of the week lists. The song was ranked the 45th best song of 2018 by Complex due to the Weeknd's emotion and vocals.

Lyrics
The song's lyrics makes references to the Weeknd's previous relationships with model Bella Hadid and singer and actress Selena Gomez, with the Weeknd expressing a desire to rekindle his relationship with Hadid.

Commercial performance
The song debuted at number 27 on the US Billboard Hot 100 on the issue dated April 7, 2018.

Charts

Weekly charts

Year-end charts

Certifications

References

External links
 

2018 songs
Songs written by Frank Dukes
Songs written by the Weeknd
The Weeknd songs
Contemporary R&B ballads
Song recordings produced by Frank Dukes
Song recordings produced by Skrillex
Songs written by Starrah